Carlos Garcia Camacho (November 16, 1924 – December 6, 1979) was an American (U.S. citizen) politician and dentist. Camacho was a former Republican Senator in the Guam Legislature. Camacho served as the last appointed Governor of Guam from 1969 to 1971 and the first elected Governor of Guam from 1971 to 1975.

Early life
Camacho was born in the village of Hagåtña, Guam to Felix Martinez Camacho (1893–1975) and Antonia Cruz Garcia (1893–1985). His siblings included Maria Josefina Tanaka, Juan Camacho, Luis Camacho and Eddie Camacho. From 1946 to 1949, he attended Aquinas College in Grand Rapids, Michigan. In 1952, he earned a D.D.S. degree from Marquette University in Milwaukee, Wisconsin.

Governorship
At the young age of forty-four, Camacho succeeded Governor Manuel F.L. Guerrero as governor of Guam, and Kurt Moylan was appointed as lieutenant governor on July 20, 1969. Camacho's term as appointed governor lasted only eighteen months, due to the Elective Governor Act that was passed into law by the U.S. Congress in 1968, allowing for Guam's citizens to choose their governor. The act took effect in 1970, when Guam's first election was held. Camacho's term was best remembered for his Christmas 1969 visit to the troops from Guam who were fighting in Vietnam.

Camacho-Salas Campaign
Camacho first selected senator G. Ricardo Salas as his lieutenant governor running mate, but Salas was subsequently replaced by Kurt Moylan.

Camacho-Moylan Campaign
Camacho was a candidate in Guam's first election for governor with Kurt Moylan running for lieutenant governor after winning the Republican primary. The Democratic primary was close between former governor Manuel F. L. Guerrero, Senator Ricardo Bordallo and attorney and former speaker Joaquin C. "Kin" Arriola. After a contentious runoff election, Bordallo defeated Guerrero, and in the general election Camacho/Moylan defeated Bordallo/Taitano.

Camacho and Moylan's historic inauguration was held on January 4, 1971 at the Plaza de España in Agana. He used the resources of the government to enhance economic opportunities by granting incentives through the Guam Economics Development and offering various forms of assistance to the private sector. During his entire five and a half years in office, Camacho presided over one of the largest eras of hotel construction activities on Guam, with construction finishing or starting on the Kakue Hotel, Reef Hotel, Hilton Hotel, Okura Hotel, Fujita Tumon Beach, Continental Travelodge, and Guam Dai Ichi Hotel.

Camacho initiated massive road projects that were continued by his successors, including the widening of Marine Drive (now Marine Corps Drive) from Hospital Road north to Route 16 in Harmon, and the reconstruction of other major highways in the villages of Agat, Dededo and Tamuning, among others.

He is also credited with enticing many educated Chamorros back to Guam, to reverse what was seen as a “brain drain” at the time, including Tony Palomo, Greg Sanchez, Mary Sanchez, Tony Unpingco, Dr. Pedro C. Sanchez, Dr. Katherine Aguon, Juan C. Tenorio, Bert Unpingco, Ben Perez, Eddie Duenas, Joseph F. Ada and Frank Blas. Many of them took jobs with the government of Guam as administrators and later became senators. Camacho also kept on other able administrators even if they were not of his party affiliation which served to stabilize the government.

As a team, Camacho and Moylan worked to develop economic opportunity by creating incentives to attract business and encourage local participation in business. At the time Guam elected its first governor the federal government still had control over much of the island's utilities and roads. They struggled to work toward gaining more self-government and self-determination.

In the 1974 gubernatorial election, he was defeated for reelection in a re-match with senator Ricardo Bordallo who won the election. An election challenge by the Bordallo/Sablan campaign went all the way to the U.S. Supreme Court. Following his unsuccessful bid for reelection as governor, Camacho resumed his career as a dentist.

Personal life
Camacho's wife was Lourdes Perez Camacho. They have seven children. Camacho's son Felix Perez Camacho served as Governor of Guam from 2003 to 2011. Camacho's only daughter Mary Camacho Torres became senator in the Guam Legislature. Camacho's other children are Carlos, Thomas, Ricardo, Francis, Victor.

Later years
Following his defeat, Camacho returned to his career as a dentist, continuing in private practice until his death on December 6, 1979 four years later, at the age of 55. He is now buried at the Pigo Cemetery in Anigua.

Electoral history

References

External links
Carlos Garcia Camacho Bio at Guampedia
Carlos G. Camacho entry at the National Governors Association
 
In the 1974 gubernatorial election, he was defeated for reelection in a re-match with senator Ricardo Bordallo who won the election. An election challenge by the Bordallo/Sablan campaign went all the way to the U.S. Supreme Court. Following his unsuccessful bid for reelection as governor, Camacho resumed his career as a dentist.Carlos Garcia Camacho entry at The Political Graveyard

|-

1924 births
1979 deaths
20th-century American politicians
20th-century dentists
Aquinas College (Michigan) alumni
Chamorro people
Governors of Guam
Guamanian dentists
Guamanian military personnel
Guamanian people of Spanish descent
Guamanian Republicans
Marquette University alumni
Members of the Legislature of Guam
People from Hagåtña, Guam
Republican Party governors of Guam
United States Army officers